The George V. Doughty House and Garage are a historic house and garage located northeast of Jerome, Idaho, United States. The lava rock buildings were constructed in 1914 by stonemason H. T. Pugh for farmer George V. Doughty. The house's design includes a Colonial Revival style hipped roof and a bungalow style front porch.

The house and garage were listed on the National Register of Historic Places in 1983.

See also

 List of National Historic Landmarks in Idaho
 National Register of Historic Places listings in Jerome County, Idaho

References

1914 establishments in Idaho
Bungalow architecture in Idaho
Colonial Revival architecture in Idaho
Houses completed in 1914
Houses in Jerome County, Idaho
Houses on the National Register of Historic Places in Idaho
National Register of Historic Places in Jerome County, Idaho